Narcissus at the Fountain is a 1500–1510 oil-on-panel painting by Giovanni Antonio Boltraffio, now in the Uffizi, in Florence. A copy is held in the National Gallery, London. Both works show a young man in profile, interpreted as Narcissus due to his downward gaze.

Strongly influenced by Leonardo da Vinci, particularly in the background, reminiscent of the Virgin of the Rocks), the work has several elements in common with other colleagues of Boltraffio such as Bernardino Luini and Andrea Solario, which in the past has caused attribution difficulties.

References

1510 paintings
Paintings in the collection of the Uffizi
Paintings depicting Greek myths
Paintings by Giovanni Antonio Boltraffio